Majority rule is the principle that the group that has the most supporters gets its way. It is the binary decision rule most often used in decision-making bodies, including many legislatures of democratic nations.

Alternatives

Plurality 
One alternative to majority rule is plurality (first past the post or FPTP). This is often used in elections with more than two candidates. In this case, the winner is the one with the most votes, whether or not that constitutes a majority.

Supermajority 
Parliamentary rules may prescribe the use of a supermajoritarian rule under certain circumstances, such as the 60% filibuster rule to close debate in the US Senate.

Use 
Majority rule is common in liberal democracies. It is used in legislatures and other bodies. It is one of the basic rules of parliamentary procedure such as Robert's Rules of Order. Many referendums are also decided by majority rule.

Properties

May's Theorem 

According to Kenneth May, majority rule is the only "fair" decision rule. Majority rule does not let some votes count more than others or privilege an alternative by requiring fewer votes to pass. Formally, majority rule is the only binary decision rule that has the following properties:

 Fairness: This can be separated into two properties:
 Anonymity: the decision rule treats each voter identically. Who casts a vote makes no difference; the voter's identity need not be disclosed.
 Neutrality: the decision rule treats each alternative equally. This is unlike supermajoritarian rules, which can allow the status quo to prevail even though it received fewer votes.
 Decisiveness: the decision rule selects a unique winner.
 Monotonicity: If a voter changes a preference, MR never switches the outcome against that voter. If the outcome the voter now prefers would have won, it still does so. 

Majority rule meets these criteria only if the number of voters is odd or infinite. If the number of voters is even, ties are possible, violating neutrality. Some assembilies permit the chair to vote only to break ties. This substitutes a loss of anonymity for the loss of neutrality.

Other properties

Voting paradox 
In group decision-making voting paradoxes can form. It is possible that alternatives a, b, and c exist such that a majority prefers a to b, another majority prefers b to c, and yet another majority prefers c to a. Because majority rule requires an alternative to have majority support to pass, majority rule is vulnerable to rejecting the majority's decision. (The minimum number of alternatives that can form such a cycle (voting paradox) is 3 if the number of voters is different from 4, because the Nakamura number of the majority rule is 3. For supermajority rules the minimum number is often greater, because the Nakamura number is often greater.)

Responsiveness 
Rae argued and Taylor proved in 1969 that majority rule maximizes the likelihood that the issues a voter votes for will pass and that the issues a voter votes against will fail.

Utilitarian welfare 
Schmitz and Tröger (2012) consider a collective choice problem with two alternatives and show that majority rule maximizes utilitarian welfare among all incentive-compatible, anonymous, and neutral voting rules, provided that voters' types are independent. When votersʼ utilities are stochastically correlated, other dominant-strategy choice rules may perform better than majority rule. Azrieli and Kim (2014) extend the analysis of independent types to asymmetric environments and by considering both anonymous and non-anonymous rules.

Limitations

Arguments for limitations

Minority rights 

Because only a majority can win a vote under majority rule, majority rule can lead to tyranny of the majority. Requiring a super-majority is a potential response. However, supermajority rules do not guarantee that a particular minority will be protected; instead they privilege the status quo and prevent a simple majority from overturning it. McGann argued that when only one of multiple minorities is protected by such a rule, the protection is for the status quo, rather than for the faction that supports it.

Another possible way to prevent tyranny is to elevate certain rights as inalienable. Thereafter, any decision that targets such a right might be majoritarian, but it would not be legitimate, because it would violate the requirement for equal rights. 

In response, majority rule advocates argue that because the procedure that privileges constitutional rights is generally super-majoritarian rule, this solution super-majoritian problems. Constitutional rights cannot by themselves offer protection. Under some circumstances, the legal rights of one person cannot be guaranteed without injustly imposing on someone else. McGann wrote, "one man's right to property in the antebellum South was another man's slavery." Amartya Sen noted the liberal paradox, stating that a proliferation of rights may make everyone worse off.

Erroneous priorities
The erroneous priorities effect (EPE) states that groups that act upon what they initially consider important almost always misplace their effort. Such groups have not yet determined which factors are most influential. Only after identifying those factors can they take effective action. EPE was articulated by Dye at the Food and Drug Administration. This discovery led to the recognition that even with good intentions, effective action requires a different paradigm for language and voting. EPE is a negative consequence of phenomena such as spreadthink and groupthink. Effective priorities are dependent on recognizing the influence patterns of global interdependencies and are defeated by EPE when priorities simply aggregate individual stakeholder's subjective voting that does not consider those interdependencies. Dye's work resulted in the discovery of the 6th law of the science of structured dialogic design, namely that "Learning occurs in a dialogue as the observers search for influence relationships among the members of a set of observations."

Other arguments for limitations 

Seeds For Change argued that majority rule can lead to poor deliberative practice or even to "an aggressive culture and conflict." Along these lines, majority rule may fail to measure the preferences intensity. The authors of An Anarchist Critique of Democracy argue that "two voters who are casually interested in doing something" can defeat one voter who has "dire opposition" to the proposal of the two.

Voting theorists claimed that cycling leads to debilitating instability. Buchanan and Tullock argue that unanimity is the only decision rule that guarantees economic efficiency.

Supermajority rules may be used in binary decisions where a positive decision is more significant than a negative one. Under supermajority voting, a positive decision is made if and only if the supermajority threshold is reached—for example, two thirds or three fourths. For example, US jury decisions require the support of at least 10 of 12 jurors, or even unanimous support. This supermajoritarian concept follows directly from the presumption of innocence on which the US legal system is based. Rousseau advocated supermajority voting on important decisions when he said, "The more the deliberations are important and serious, the more the opinion that carries should approach unanimity."

Arguments against limitations

Minority rights 

McGann argued that majority rule helps to protect minority rights, at least in deliberative settings. The argument is that cycling ensures that parties that lose to a majority have an interest to remain part of the group's process, because any decision can easily be overturned by another majority. Furthermore, suppose a minority wishes to overturn a decision. In that case, it needs to form a coalition with only enough group members to ensure that more than half approve the new proposal. Under supermajority rules, a minority needs its own supermajority to overturn a decision.

To support the view that majority rule protects minority rights better than supermajority rules, McGann pointed to the cloture rule in the US Senate, which was used to prevent the extension of civil liberties to racial minorities. Saunders, while agreeing that majority rule may offer better protection than supermajority rules, argued that majority rule may nonetheless be of little help to the least minorities.

Other arguments 
Saunders argued that deliberative democracy flourishes under majority rule and that under majority rule, participants always have to convince more than half the group, while under supermajoritarian rules participants might only need to persuade a minority (to prevent a change). McGann argued that cycling encourages participants to compromise, rather than pass resolutions that have the bare minimum required to "win" because of the likelihood that they would soon be reversed.

Within this atmosphere of compromise, a minority faction may accept proposals that it dislikes in order to build a coalition for a proposal that it deems of greater moment. In that way, majority rule differentiates weak and strong preferences. McGann argued that such situations encourage minorities to participate, because majority rule does not typically create permanent losers, encouraging systemic stability. He pointed to governments that use largely unchecked majority rule, such as the Netherlands, Austria, and Sweden as empirical evidence of majority rule's stability.

See also
 Appeal to the majority
 Arrow's theorem
 Condorcet's jury theorem
 Majority criterion
 Majority loser criterion
 Mutual majority criterion
 Majoritarianism
 Majoritarian democracy
 No independence before majority rule (NIBMAR)
 Ochlocracy
 Quadratic voting
 Voting system criterion
 Voting system

References

Further reading
 
 
 
 

Monotonic electoral systems
Voting theory